The Memorial Mario Albisetti, also known as the Lugano Trophy and GP Città di Lugano, is an annual racewalking competition over 20 kilometres that is held in March on the streets of Lugano, Switzerland. It was first held in 2003.

It is one of highest profile annual international racewalking meetings, having both permit status from European Athletics and forming part of the annual IAAF World Race Walking Challenge circuit. It attracts top level racewalkers from across the world. Past winners include Olympic medallists Wang Zhen, Alex Schwazer and world champion Michele Didoni. Schwazer broke Maurizio Damilano's long-standing Italian national record in the 20 km walk en route to his 2010 win.

The course for the race follows the banks of Lake Lugano. It begins and ends at the fountain on Piazza Manzoni – a square near the city's town hall. The straight-looped course of two kilometres is entirely flat. It follows the lakeside roads of Giacondo Albertolli and Vincenzo Vela and has turning points at the end of Vincenzo Vela road and near the Museo Civico di Belle Arti (Civic Museum of Fine Art).

The race director is Daniele Albisetti, a relative of Mario Albisetti. The race is organised by the Societa Atletica Lugano under the patronage of the Lugano City council and Banca dello Stato del Cantone Ticino.

The city of Lugano has a long tradition in racewalking competitions and was host to the first ever IAAF World Race Walking Cup in 1961 and again in 1973.

Past winners
Key:

 The first women's race in 2003 was held over 10 kilometres.

See also
 Lugano Trophy (World Race Walking Cup)

References

List of winners
Albo d'Oro Lugano Trophy – Memorial Mario Albisetti. Lugano Racewalking. Retrieved on 2014-03-22.

External links
Official website
Swiss Walking Federation, official website with pictures

Racewalking competitions
Recurring sporting events established in 2003
Lugano
Tourist attractions in Ticino
Athletics competitions in Switzerland
Spring (season) events in Switzerland